Bathurst Inlet, (Inuinnaqtun: Qingaut Kingaok, Inuktitut syllabics: ᕿᙵᐅᓐ), is a small Inuit community located in Bathurst Inlet in the Kitikmeot Region of Nunavut, Canada.

The Inuit name for the community is Kingaun (old orthography) or Qingaut (new orthography), meaning nose mountain, which refers to a hill close to the community. Thus, the people of the area are referred to as "Kingaunmiut" (miut - people of).

The traditional language of the area was Inuinnaqtun and is written using the Latin alphabet rather than the syllabics of the Inuktitut writing system. Like Kugluktuk, Cambridge Bay and Umingmaktok syllabics are rarely seen and used mainly by the Government of Nunavut.

Bathurst Inlet is the traditional birthing grounds of a "key northern species", the large, migratory Bathurst herd of barren-ground caribou. Over millennia, the Inuit, First Nations and Métis depended on the Bathurst Inlet herd for survival.

History
The first Europeans known to have visited the area was during the first expedition of John Franklin in 1821. There was little outside contact until 1936 when both the Catholic Church and the Hudson's Bay Company (HBC) arrived. Although, the Hudson's Bay Company abandoned the site in 1964 (for Umingmaktok) the Inuit decided to remain in the area and continue the traditional lifestyle.

During the early 1960s, the area was visited by Glen Warner, a sergeant with the Royal Canadian Mounted Police. Warner, along with his wife Trish, purchased both the mission house and the HBC post which they turned into the "Bathurst Inlet Lodge". It is operated today as a joint venture between the Warners and the Kapolaks, and is open during the short Arctic summer.

The lodge is a popular destination for tourists who wish to see a more traditional type Inuit lifestyle and wildlife such as foxes, seals, barren-ground caribou, Arctic char and muskox. Also in the area is the Wilberforce Falls, the highest waterfall above the Arctic Circle.

Like other communities in Nunavut, the only access is by aircraft. Although most tourists arrive from Yellowknife, Northwest Territories, it is possible to charter an aircraft from Cambridge Bay. The community has no local phone service and contact with the outside world is maintained by satellite phone.

Like its sister community, Umingmaktok, schooling is provided by flying the students to Cambridge Bay and returning them for Christmas and the summer.

Dr. L.H. Vashon, Dr. Rosalie Garcia, and Dr. Carl Smith visited Bathurst Inlet and the surrounding areas in 1993 to study the Casimir effect.

Demographics 

Bathurst herd
Bathurst Inlet is the traditional birthing grounds of the migratory Bathurst herd of barren-ground caribou. The herd had experienced a rapid decline from 186,000 animals in 2003 to "approximately 16,000-22,000 animals" in 2015. The herd migrates from the birthing grounds to their winter grounds which extends from southern and central Northwest Territories (NWT). In some years, the herd winters as "far south as northern Saskatchewan." According to Environment and Natural Resources (ENR), "The Bathurst Herd are barren-ground caribou, a key northern species. They have shaped the cultural identity of First Nations, Inuit and Métis peoples over millennia through mutual relationships built on respect." The Bathurst herd was the lifeblood of the Lutsel K'e Dene First Nation in the N.W.T., but by 2017, they faced "a complete ban on hunting from the Bathurst caribou herd."

Sabina gold and silver project

With hopes of more jobs and the guarantee of state-of-the-art protection for the Bathurst caribou, the Kitikmeot Inuit Association among others, have agreed to the gold mine proposal by Vancouver-based Sabina Gold and Silver in the final hearings. Sabina's Matthew Pickard said, "Our objective is to have no impact on caribou herds as a result of this project." According to the CBC, the "proposed mine lies on the eastern fringe of the Bathurst caribou range and in the midst of the range of the Beverly/Ahiak herd, but does not significantly infringe on the calving or post-calving grounds of either herd."

Gallery

See also
Umingmuktogmiut, a geographically defined Copper Inuit band in the northern Canadian territory of Nunavut.

References

Further reading

 Bathurst Caribou Management Planning Committee. A Management Plan for the Bathurst Caribou Herd. [N.W.T.]: Bathurst Caribou Management Planning Committee, 2005.
 Bird, John Brian. Bathurst Inlet, Northwest Territories. [Ottawa]: Geographical Branch, Mines and Technical Surveys, 1961.
 Cody, William J. New Plant Records from Bathurst Inlet, N.W.T. S.l: s.n, 1954.
 Gunn, A., and Adrian D'Hont. Extent of Calving for the Bathurst and Ahiak Caribou Herds, June 2002. Yellowknife, NWT: Dept. of Resources, Wildlife & Economic Development, Govt. of the Northwest Territories, 2002.
 Kerr, Daniel K. 1996. "Late Quaternary Sea Level History in the Paulatuk to Bathurst Inlet Area, Northwest Territories". Canadian Journal of Earth Sciences. 33, no. 3: 389.
 Kingsley, Michael. A Literature Survey of the Wildlife of Bathurst Inlet, Northwest Territories. Edmonton, Alta: Canadian Wildlife Service, 1979.
 McEwen, Eoin H. 1957. "Birds Observed at Bathurst Inlet, Northwest Territories". Canadian Field-Naturalist. 71, no. 3: 109–115.
 Relf, Carolyn Diane. Report on Lapidary Occurrences in the Bathurst Inlet Area, N.W.T. Yellowknife: NWT Geology Division - NAP, Indian and Northern Affairs Canada, 1993.
 Thorpe, N. L. 1997. "The Tuktu and Nogak Project: Inuit Knowledge About Caribou and Calving Areas in the Bathurst Inlet Region". Arctic. 50, no. 4: 381.
 Thorpe, Natasha, Sandra Eyegetok, and Naikak Hakongak. Thunder on the Tundra Inuit Qaujimajatuqangit of the Bathurst Caribou. [Ikaluktuuthak, NU]: Tuktu and Nogak Project, 2001. 
 Zoltai, S. C., D. J. Karasiuk, and G. W. Scotter. A Natural Resource Survey of the Bathurst Inlet Area, Northwest Territories. Ottawa: Parks Canada, 1980.

External links

Government of Nunavut

Ghost towns in Nunavut
Hudson's Bay Company trading posts in Nunavut
Populated places in the Kitikmeot Region
Road-inaccessible communities of Nunavut